Dalla semiargentea is a species of butterfly in the family Hesperiidae. It is found in Colombia.

References

Butterflies described in 1867
semiargentea
Hesperiidae of South America
Taxa named by Baron Cajetan von Felder
Taxa named by Rudolf Felder